The National Property Law Digests are annual volumes published by Strafford since 1961 that cover all significant court decisions in the fields of real property and property transactions. It consists of twelve volumes published annually. The digests are frequently cited in appellate court opinions in the United States and Canada.

See also
Strafford, Dallas, Texas

Sources

American law journals
Canadian law journals
Publications established in 1961
Legal literature
Property law of Canada
Property law in the United States